Sulfur dicyanide is an inorganic compound with the formula S(CN)2.  A white solid, the compound is mainly of theoretical and fundamental interest given its simplicity.  It is the first member of the dicyanosulfanes Sx(CN)2, which includes thiocyanogen ((SCN)2) and higher polysulfanes up to S4(CN)2.  According to X-ray crystallography, the molecule is planar, the SCN units are linear, with an S-C-S angle of 95.6°.  The synthesis of S(CN)2 is attributed to Söderbäck through his investigation of the reactions of metal cyanides and sulfur halides.

References

Inorganic carbon compounds
Inorganic sulfur compounds
Inorganic nitrogen compounds
Thiocyanates